Burichang, also known as Burichong, is an upazila of Comilla District in the Division of Chittagong, Bangladesh.

History
Raghunath Tarkavachaspati, a Bramhin scholar in the subject of logic migrated from Dingshai village now in West Bengal in the 17th century to establish the village of Burichang on the land granted to him by Chhatra Manikya [Nakshatra Rai] the Maharaja of Tripura to start a Toll (an institute for Vedic learning).

Geography
It has 37,739 households and a total area of .which is located at the extreme near the Upazila by the Dhaka Chittagong Highway. The river Gumti flows through this Upazila. There is a lot of green forests here. There are some kinds of birds and wild animals. Moreover, there are snakes and reptiles. There are mud houses here. Jackfruit, mango, blackberry, litchi, many more fruit trees can be seen. Burichang village area is within the municipality and the value of property here, like the rest of the municipality, has increased significantly.

Demographics

According to the 2011 Census of Bangladesh, Burichang upazila had a population of 301,825 living in 58,402 households. Its growth rate over the decade 2001-2011 was 16.42%. Burichang has a sex ratio of 1067 females per 1000 males and a literacy rate of 57.03%. 12,776 (4.23%) live in urban areas.

Administration
Burichang Upazila is divided into eight union parishads: 4 No Sholanal Union Parishad, Bakshimul, Burichang, Moynamoti, 7 No Mokam, Pirjatrapur, Rajapur, Sholonal, and Varella.

The union parishads are subdivided into 149 mauzas and 172 villages.

See also
Upazilas of Bangladesh
Districts of Bangladesh
Divisions of Bangladesh

References

 
Upazilas of Comilla District